The Daiichi Kosho DK 472 is a Japanese aircraft engine that was developed by the Daiichi Kosho Company in the early 1990s for powered paragliding. The company had been previously noted for producing electronics, particularly karaoke equipment.

Design and development
The DK 472 was a custom-designed engine that was part of the manufacturer's plan to build a mass-market paramotor. The DK 472 was supplanted by a single cylinder design and then, when the market never developed into the size envisioned by the company, all engine production was ceased in circa 2003.

The DK 472 is a twin cylinder, horizontally-opposed, air-cooled, two stroke engine that produces . Early versions were direct drive using a small diameter  propeller. Later versions used a belt reduction drive system and a larger propeller. Electric start was standard equipment.

Applications
Daiichi Kosho Beat
Daiichi Kosho Whisper

Specifications (DK 472)

References

Air-cooled aircraft piston engines
Daiichi Kosho aircraft engines
Two-stroke aircraft piston engines